The world's tallest human-made structure is the  Burj Khalifa in Dubai, United Arab Emirates. The building gained the official title of "tallest building in the world" and the tallest self-supported structure at its opening on January 9, 2010. The second-tallest self-supporting structure and the tallest tower in the world is the Tokyo Skytree.

The Council on Tall Buildings and Urban Habitat, an organization that certifies buildings as the "World's Tallest", recognizes a building only if at least 49% of its height is made up of floor plates containing habitable floor area. Structures that do not meet this criterion, such as the CN Tower, are defined as "towers".

There are dozens of radio and television broadcasting towers which measure over 600 metres (about 2,000 ft) in height, and only the tallest are recorded in publicly available information sources.

Debate over definition 
The assessment of the height of artificial structures has been controversial. Because varying standards have been used by different organizations, the accepted height of these structures or buildings depends on which standards are accepted. The Council on Tall Buildings and Urban Habitat has changed its definitions over time. Some of the controversy regarding the definitions and assessment of tall structures and buildings has included the following:
 the definition of a structure, a building and a tower 
 whether a structure, building or tower under construction should be included in any assessment
 whether a structure, building or tower has to be officially opened before it is assessed
 whether structures built in and rising above water should have their below-water height included in any assessment.
 whether a structure, building or tower that is guyed is assessed in the same category as self-supporting structures.

Within an accepted definition of a building further controversy has included the following factors:
 whether only habitable height of the building is considered
 whether communication towers with observation galleries should be considered "habitable" in this sense
 whether rooftop antennas, viewing platforms or any other architecture that does not form a habitable floor should be included in the assessment
 whether a floor built at a high level of a telecommunications or viewing tower should change the tower's definition to that of a "building"

Tallest structures

This category does not require the structure to be "officially" open, but does require it to be "topped out."

The tallest artificial structure is Burj Khalifa, a skyscraper in Dubai that reached  in height on January 17, 2009. By April 8, 2008 it had been built higher than the KVLY-TV mast in North Dakota, US. That September it officially surpassed Poland's  Warsaw radio mast, which stood from 1974 to 1991, to become the tallest structure ever built. Guyed lattice towers such as these masts had held the world height record since 1954.

However, it is debated whether underwater height should be counted, in the same manner as height below ground is ignored on buildings. However, these platforms are not considered constant structures as the vast majority of their height is made up of the length of the tendons attaching the floating platforms to the sea floor.

Taipei 101 in Taipei, Taiwan, set records in three of the four skyscraper categories at the time it opened in 2004; at the time the Burj Khalifa opened in 2010 it remained the world's tallest inhabited building  as measured to its architectural height (spire).

Burj Khalifa broke the height record in all four categories for completed buildings.

Tallest structure by category

Due to the disagreements over how to measure height and classify structures, engineers have created various definitions for categories of buildings and other structures. One measure includes the absolute height of a building, another includes only spires and other permanent architectural features, but not antennas. The tradition of including the spire on top of a building and not including the antenna dates back to the rivalry between the Chrysler Building and 40 Wall Street. A modern-day example is that the antenna on top of Willis Tower (formerly Sears Tower) is not considered part of its architectural height, while the spires on top of the Petronas Twin Towers are counted.

Note: The following table is a list of the tallest completed structure in each of the structural categories below. For a list of structures by function see the list later in the article. There can only be one structure in each category, unless the tallest is the same for more than one structure in the same category.

Tallest destroyed structures by category, not surpassed by existing structures
There are some destroyed architectural structures which were taller than the tallest existing structure of their type. There are also destroyed structures omitted from this list that had been surpassed in height prior to being destroyed.

Tallest structure by function

* "Mixed-use" is defined as having three or more real estate uses (such as retail, office, hotel, etc.) that are physically and functionally integrated in a single property and are mutually supporting.

Tallest buildings 

Up until the late 1990s, the definition of “tallest building” was not altogether clear. It was generally understood to be the height of the building to the top of its architectural elements including spires, but not including "temporary" structures (such as antennas or flagpoles), which could be added or changed relatively easily without requiring major changes to the building's design. Other criteria for height measurement generally were not considered, which occasionally caused some controversy.

One historic case involved the building now famous for the Times Square Ball. Known as One Times Square (at 1475 Broadway in Midtown Manhattan), it was the headquarters for  The New York Times,  which gave Times Square its name.

A bigger controversy was the rivalry between two New York City skyscrapers built in the Roaring Twenties—the Chrysler Building and 40 Wall Street. Although the architects of record for 40 Wall were H. Craig Severance and Yasuo Matsui, the firm of Shreve & Lamb (who also designed the Empire State Building) served as consulting architects. They wrote a newspaper article claiming that 40 Wall was actually the tallest, since it contained the world's highest usable floor. They pointed out that the observation deck of 40 Wall was nearly  higher than the top floor of the Chrysler, whose surpassing spire was strictly ornamental and essentially inaccessible. Despite the protest, the Chrysler Building was generally accepted as the tallest building in the world for almost a year, until it was surpassed by the Empire State Building’s  in 1931.

That was in turn surpassed by the  twin towers of New York’s original World Trade Center in 1972, which were in turn surpassed by the Sears Tower in Chicago in 1974. Thus the status of the Willis Tower as the “totally” tallest was restored in the face of a new threat looming in the Far East—the “Siamese Twins.”

A major controversy erupted upon completion of the Petronas Towers in Kuala Lumpur, Malaysia in 1998. Counting buildings as structures with floors throughout, and with antenna masts excluded, the Willis was still considered the tallest at that time. Excluding their spires, which are  higher than the flat roof of Willis, the Petronas Towers are not taller than Willis. At their convention in Chicago, the Council on Tall Buildings and Urban Habitat (CTBUH) found the Willis Tower (without its antennas) to be the third-tallest building, and the Petronas Towers (with their spires) to be the world's two tallest buildings.

Responding to the ensuing controversy, the CTBUH then revised their criteria and defined four categories in which the world's tallest building can be measured, retaining the old criterion of height to architectural top, and adding three new categories:

 Height to Architectural Top (including spires and pinnacles, but not antennas, masts or flagpoles). This measurement is the most widely used and is used to define the rankings of the 100 Tallest Buildings in the World.
 Highest Occupied Floor
 Height to Top of Roof (omitted from criteria from November 2009 onwards)
 Height to Tip

The height-to-roof criterion was discontinued because relatively few modern tall buildings possess flat rooftops, making this criterion difficult to determine and measure. The CTBUH has further clarified their definitions of building height, including specific criteria concerning subbasements and ground level entrances (height measured from lowest, significant, open-air, pedestrian entrance rather than from a previously undefined "main entrance"), building completion (must be topped out both structurally and architecturally, fully clad, and able to be occupied), condition of the highest occupied floor (must be continuously used by people living or working and be conditioned, thus including observation decks, but not mechanical floors) and other aspects of tall buildings.

The height is measured from the level of the lowest, significant, open-air, pedestrian entrance. At the time, the Willis Tower held first place in the second and third categories, the Petronas Towers held the first category, and the original WTC north tower held the fourth (height to tip) category with its antenna. In 2000, however, a new antenna mast was placed on the Willis Tower, giving it the record in the fourth category. On April 20, 2004, the 101-storey Taipei 101 in Taipei, Taiwan, was completed, taking the world record for the first three categories. On July 21, 2007, it was announced that Burj Khalifa in Dubai, UAE, had surpassed Taipei 101.

Before Burj Khalifa was completed, Willis Tower led in the height-to-tip category with  after its antenna was extended in 2000, making Willis Tower slightly taller height-to-tip than the WTC north tower's antenna that measured . After the terrorist attacks on September 11, 2001, the WTC became the world's tallest two buildings to be destroyed or demolished.

A different superlative for skyscrapers is their number of floors. The original World Trade Center set that record at 110 in the early 1970s, and this was not surpassed until the Burj Khalifa opened in 2010.

Tall freestanding structures such as the CN Tower, the Ostankino Tower and the Oriental Pearl Tower are excluded from these categories because they are not "habitable buildings", which are defined as frame structures made with floors and walls throughout.

History of record holders in each CTBUH category

Tallest freestanding structures on land

Freestanding structures must not be supported by guy wires, the sea or other types of support. It therefore does not include guyed masts, partially guyed towers and drilling platforms but does include towers, skyscrapers (pinnacle height) and chimneys.
(See also history of tallest skyscrapers.)

The world's tallest freestanding structure on land is defined as the tallest self-supporting artificial structure that stands above ground. This definition is different from that of world's tallest building or world's tallest structure based on the percentage of the structure that is occupied and whether or not it is self-supporting or supported by exterior cables. Likewise, this definition does not count structures that are built underground or on the seabed, such as the Petronius Platform in the Gulf of Mexico. Visit world's tallest structure by category for a list of various other definitions.

The tallest freestanding structure on land is the Burj Khalifa in Dubai, United Arab Emirates. The building surpassed the height of the previous record holder, the  CN Tower in Toronto, Ontario, on September 12, 2007.

History
The following is a list of structures that have held the title as the tallest freestanding structure on land.

It was the world's tallest non-pyramidal structure for many centuries. These were both the world's tallest or second-tallest non-pyramidal structure for over a thousand years.

World's highest observation deck

Timeline of development of world's highest observation deck since inauguration of Eiffel Tower.

Higher observation decks have existed on mountain tops or cliffs, rather than on tall structures.

Timeline of guyed structures on land
As most of the tallest structures are guyed masts, here is a timeline of world's tallest guyed masts, since the beginning of radio technology.

As many large guyed masts were destroyed at the end of World War II, the dates for the years between 1945 and 1950 may be incorrect. If Wusung Radio Tower survived World War II, it was the tallest guyed structure shortly after World War II.

Tallest towers

Towers include observation towers, monuments and other structures not generally considered to be "habitable buildings", they are meant for "regular access by humans, but not for living in or office work, and are self-supporting or freestanding, which means no guy-wires for support", meaning it excludes from this list of continuously habitable buildings and skyscrapers as well as radio and TV masts.

Bridge towers or pylons, chimneys, transmission towers, and most large statues allow human access for maintenance, but not as part of their normal operation, and are therefore not considered to be towers.

History of tallest tower 

The following is a list of structures that have historically held the title as the tallest towers in the world.

Tallest structures, freestanding structures, and buildings

The list categories are:
The structures (supported) list uses pinnacle height and includes architectural structures of any type that might use some external support constructions like cables and are fully built in air.
The structures (media supported) list uses pinnacle height and includes architectural structures of any type that are not totally built in the air but are using support from other, denser media like salt water.
The freestanding structures list uses pinnacle height and includes structures over  that do not use guy-wires or other external supports. This means truly free standing on its own or, in similar sense, non-supported structures.
The building list uses architectural height (excluding antennas) and includes only buildings, defined as consisting of habitable floors. Both of these follow CTBUH guidelines. All supertall buildings (450 m and higher) are listed.

Notes:
Eight buildings appear on the freestanding structures category list with heights different from another category. This is due to the different measurement specifications of those lists.
Only current heights and, where reasonable, target heights are listed. Historical heights of structures that no longer exist, for example, for having collapsed, are excluded.

Source: Emporis

See also
 List of tallest buildings
 List of tallest towers
 List of tallest structures
 List of tallest freestanding structures
 List of tallest freestanding steel structures
 List of tallest chimneys
 List of tallest bridges
 List of tallest dams
 Lattice tower
 Solar power tower
 Tallest industrial buildings
 List of elevator test towers
 List of hyperboloid structures
 List of tallest cooling towers
 List of tallest oil platforms
 List of tallest statues
 List of tallest minarets
 List of tallest church buildings
 List of tallest wooden buildings
 List of tallest clock towers
 List of tallest residential buildings
 List of tallest hotels
 List of tallest hospitals
 List of tallest educational buildings
 List of tallest structures built before the 20th century

References

External links
Tallest Buildings in the Islamic World (2017)
 Collection of many record holders on Skyscraperpage
 tallestbuildingintheworld.net 
 A map visualization of each country's tallest building
 The highest abandoned skyscraper in the world

Structures
Tallest